The 2016 FIVB Beach Volleyball World Tour was the global elite professional beach volleyball circuit organized by the Fédération Internationale de Volleyball (FIVB) for the 2016 beach volleyball season. The 2016 FIVB Beach Volleyball World Tour Calendar comprised four FIVB World Tour Grand Slams, 13 Open tournaments (Doha and Kish Island only for men) and four Major Series events, organised by the Swatch Beach Volleyball Major Series.

The second edition of the Swatch Beach Volleyball FIVB World Tour Finals was held in Toronto, Canada September 13-18, 2016.

Schedule
Key

Men

Women

Medal table by country

References

External links
2016 FIVB Beach Volleyball World Tour at FIVB.org
 Swatch Major Series official website.

 

World Tour
2016
International sports competitions in Toronto